Wendelstein 7-AS (abbreviated W7-AS, for "Advanced Stellarator") was an experimental stellarator which was in operation from 1988 to 2002 by the Max Planck Institute for Plasma Physics (IPP) in Garching. It was the first of a new class of advanced stellarators with modular coils, designed with the goal of developing a nuclear fusion reactor to generate electricity. 

The experiment was succeeded by Wendelstein 7-X, which began construction in Greifswald in 2002, was completed in 2014 and started operation in December 2015. The goal of its successor is to investigate the suitability of components designed for a future fusion reactor.

Experimental Design 

Wendelstein 7-AS was a stellarator, a device which generates the magnetic fields necessary for the confinement of a hot hydrogen plasma via current-carrying coils outside the plasma. They are potential candidates for fusion reactors designed for continuous operation as the current exclusively flows on the outside of the machine, in contrast to the tokamak which generates the confining magnetic fields from the current that flows within in the plasma itself.

Wendelstein 7-AS was the first in a series of IPP stellarator experiments with a modular coil system that creates the twisted magnetic fields necessary to confine the plasma. It was designed to give the magnetic fields more degrees of freedom that allowed it shaped closer to the optimal theoretical configuration. Due to limited computing power and the need to quickly test the validity of the concept on the stellarator, only a partial optimization of the magnetic fields were carried out at Wendelstein 7-AS. It was only on the successor device Wendelstein 7-X that a full optimization of the code used to generate the fields were carried out.

Technical specifications

Project results 

The following experimental results confirmed the predictions of a partially optimized Wendelstein 7-AS and led to the development and construction of the Wendelstein 7-X:

 The magnetic field was able to trap plasma particles (mostly hydrogen ions and electrons) with higher thermal energies than its predecessors. This improvement made it possible to reach temperatures eight times higher than the internal temperature of the sun (inside the plasma ring for electrons), and slightly more (internal temperature of the sun) for hydrogen ions.
 Furthermore, it was shown that the partially optimized stellarator behaves extraordinarily "good-natured" with regard to plasma instabilities, which is of great importance for the continuous operation of a future reactor. Instabilities can lead to temporary cooling or the loss of hot plasma particles and thus reduce the plasma pressure and temperatures inside the vessel.
 A so-called island divertor was successfully operated on the Wendelstein 7-AS – the first time on a stellarator; this removes contaminants from the plasma that would additionally cool the hot plasma inside. For this purpose, the magnetic field lines at the edge of the plasma were deformed in such a way that multi-charged ions of the hot plasma hit targeted baffle plates and distribute their energy as cheaply as possible, thereby avoiding local overheating.
 The Wendelstein 7-AS was the first stellarator access the H-mode (H for "high confinement"), which was previously only accessible to tokamaks. This allows it to easily achieve ignition conditions of a fusion reactor as the plasma is able to develop an insulating layer a few centimeters thick from the edge of the machine, allowing for higher temperatures inside.

References

External links 

Stellarators
Nuclear technology in Germany
1988 in science